Alfred (Alf) Gomer Swahn (20 August 1879 – 16 March 1931) was a Swedish sport shooter who competed at the 1908, 1912, 1920 and 1924 Summer Olympics. He won nine medals: three gold, three silver and three bronze. He is the son of Oscar Swahn, an Olympic shooter who competed alongside his son at the 1908, 1912 and 1920 Olympics and won six medals.

1908 London

In 1908 Swahn was a member of the Swedish team which won the gold medal in the team running deer, single shots competition. He also participated in the individual trap event and finished 25th.

1912 Stockholm

At the 1912 Summer Olympics he won two gold medals in running deer, single shots event. One in the individual and one in the team competition. He also participated in the following events:

 running deer, double shots – fourth place
 team clay pigeons – fourth place
 trap – 21st place

1920 Antwerp

In 1920 he won two silver and one bronze medal. He also participated in the following events:

 team running deer, single shots – fourth place
 running deer, double shots – fourth place
 trap – result unknown

1924 Paris

In 1924 he won one silver and two bronze medals. He also participated in the following events:

 team clay pigeons – fifth place
 running deer, single shots – sixth place

See also
List of multiple Olympic medalists

References

External links

profile

1879 births
1931 deaths
People from Uddevalla Municipality
Swedish male sport shooters
Running target shooters
Olympic shooters of Sweden
Shooters at the 1908 Summer Olympics
Shooters at the 1912 Summer Olympics
Shooters at the 1920 Summer Olympics
Shooters at the 1924 Summer Olympics
Olympic gold medalists for Sweden
Olympic silver medalists for Sweden
Olympic bronze medalists for Sweden
Trap and double trap shooters
Olympic medalists in shooting
Medalists at the 1908 Summer Olympics
Medalists at the 1912 Summer Olympics
Medalists at the 1920 Summer Olympics
Medalists at the 1924 Summer Olympics
Sportspeople from Västra Götaland County
19th-century Swedish people
20th-century Swedish people